The 2013 Ms. Olympia contest is an IFBB professional bodybuilding competition and part of Joe Weider's Olympia Fitness & Performance Weekend 2013
to be held on September 27, 2013, at the South Hall in the Las Vegas Convention Center in Winchester, Nevada and in the Orleans Arena at The Orleans Hotel and Casino in Paradise, Nevada. It was the 34th Ms. Olympia competition held. Other events at the exhibition include the 212 Olympia Showdown, Mr. Olympia, Fitness Olympia, Figure Olympia, Bikini Olympia, Women's Physique Showdown, and Men's Physique Showdown contests.

Prize money
1st $28,000
2nd $14,000
3rd $8,000
4th $5,000
5th $3,000
6th $2,000
Total: $60,000

Results
1st - Iris Kyle
2nd - Alina Popa
3rd - Debi Laszewski
4th - Yaxeni Oriquen-Garcia
5th - Brigita Brezovac
6th - Juanita Blaino
7th - Jennifer Abshire
8th - Monique Jones
9th - Anne Freitas
10th - Cathy LeFrançois
11th - Maria Rita Bello
12th - Tina Chandler
DNF - Tammy Jones
Comparison to previous Olympia results:
Same - Iris Kyle
+2 - Alina Popa
-1 - Debi Laszewski
-1 - Yaxeni Oriquen-Garcia
Same - Brigita Brezovac
-1 - Monique Jones
-1 - Anne Freitas
+3 - Cathy LeFrançois
-2 - Tina Chandler

Scorecard

Attended
16th Ms. Olympia attended - Yaxeni Oriquen-Garcia
15th Ms. Olympia attended - Iris Kyle
6th Ms. Olympia attended - Cathy LeFrançois
5th Ms. Olympia attended - Debi Laszewski
4th Ms. Olympia attended - Tina Chandler
3rd Ms. Olympia attended - Brigita Brezovac, Monique Jones, and Alina Popa
2nd Ms. Olympia attended - Anne Freitas
1st Ms. Olympia attended - Jennifer Abshire, Maria Bello, Juanita Blaino, and Tammy Jones
Previous year Olympia attendees who did not attend - Sheila Bleck,  Kim Buck, Lisa Giesbrecht, Sarah Hayes, and Helle Trevino

Notable events
This was Iris Kyle's ninth overall Olympia win, thus breaking the record of eight overall Olympia wins she shared with Lenda Murray. She also surpassed the eight overall Mr. Olympia wins held by Lee Haney and Ronnie Coleman. This makes her the most successful professional bodybuilder in the history of both male and female professional bodybuilding. This was also Iris's eighth consecutive Ms. Olympia win.
Alina Popa placed second in this Olympia, the best placing she has had.
This was Brigita Brezovac's last Olympia before she retired from bodybuilding.

2013 Ms. Olympia qualified

Points standings

 In the event of a tie, the competitor with the best top five contest placings is awarded the qualification. If both competitors have the same contest placings, then both qualify.

See also
 2013 Mr. Olympia

References

External links
Ms. Olympia homepage

2013 in bodybuilding
Ms. Olympia
Ms. Olympia
History of female bodybuilding
Ms. Olympia 2013

es:Ms. Olympia
it:Ms. Olympia
he:גברת אולימפיה
nl:Ms. Olympia
pl:Ms. Olympia
pt:Ms. Olympia
sv:Ms. Olympia